Kordia algicida is an algicidal, Gram-negative, strictly aerobic and non-motile bacterium from the genus Kordia which has been isolated from sea water from the Masan Bay in Korea.

References

Further reading 
 
 
 
 

Flavobacteria
Bacteria described in 2004